Guardsman is a rank used instead of private in some military units that serve as the official bodyguard of a sovereign or head of state. It is also used as a generic term for any member of a guards unit of any rank.

Canada
In the Canadian Forces, the rank is used by privates in the Governor General's Foot Guards and the Canadian Grenadier Guards. This honour was awarded by King George V in 1918 to mark the service of regiments of Foot Guards during the First World War. General Order 138 of 1923 promulgated this honour.

The rank is considered non-gender specific and therefore applies equally to female soldiers and is inclusive of any person who has earned the rank. The rank badge is identical to that of private, a single chevron.

Scandinavia

Guards units in Scandinavia all use the rank. This includes the  Danish Army's Gardehusarregimentet (Guard Hussar Regiment) and Den Kongelige Livgarde (Royal Life Guards), the Norwegian Army's Hans Majestet Kongens Garde (His Majesty's Royal Guard), and the Swedish Army's Life Guards.

India
In the Indian Army the rank is used by the elite Brigade of the Guards. It is also used by the Indian Home Guards as a rank equivalent to a constable in the Indian Police Service. The rank is used for regular employees and not volunteers.

Singapore
In the Singapore Armed Forces, the rank is used by the elite Singapore Guards.

United Kingdom
The British Army's Foot Guards regiments have used the rank since 1920, when it was adopted instead of private. It is abbreviated Gdsm.

United States
It is also used to refer to members of the National Guard of the United States, a reserve force of the U.S. Army and Air Force.

References

Military ranks
Guards Division (United Kingdom)
Military ranks of the British Army
Military ranks of Canada